Akbar Mirzoyev (Russian and Tajik: Акбар Мирзоев, born February 15, 1939) is a Tajikistani politician. He was the second Prime Minister of Tajikistan between January 9, 1992, and September 21, 1992.

References

1939 births
Living people
Prime Ministers of Tajikistan
People from Khatlon Region
Tajikistani diplomats
Ambassadors of Tajikistan to Germany